Rial, riyal, or RIAL may refer to:

 Rial (surname), a surname (and list of people with the name)
 Royal Institution for the Advancement of Learning, McGill University
 Rial Racing, a former German Formula One team

Various currencies named rial or riyal (derived from Spanish/Portuguese real):

 Iranian rial, the currency of Iran
 Omani rial, the currency of Oman
 Yemeni rial, the currency of Yemen
 Moroccan rial, a former currency of Morocco
 Tunisian rial, a former currency of Tunisia
 The Hejaz riyal
 The Qatari riyal
 The Saudi riyal
 A popular nickname for the 20-piastres Egyptian coin
 A popular nickname for the 5-santimat Moroccan coin

See also
 Real (disambiguation)
 Riel (disambiguation)
 Royal (disambiguation)